Hemipristis serra is an extinct species of weasel shark which existed during the Miocene epoch. It was described by Louis Agassiz in 1843. While today's snaggletooth shark is not very large or dangerous, Hemipristis serra, which lived in the Atlantic Ocean during the Oligocene and Miocene, was considerably larger than its modern-day relative and had much larger teeth. Its total length is estimated to be . Marks made by the teeth of H. serra are often found on the bones of the manatee Metaxytherium leading some scientists to hypothesize that H. serra specialized in preying on these sirenians. In the Gatun Formation of Panama, H. serra was contemporary with pups of the large lamniform shark Otodus megalodon, and both it and the great hammerhead are theorized to have preyed on the pups of this larger shark due to their presence within the formation. 

The unusual teeth of Hemipristis serra are highly prized by collectors because they are often found in sediments in Southern Florida that yield extremely colorful fossil shark teeth. Their outstandingly large serrations make it a favorite and unique collectible fossil. Little else is known about the general appearance of H. serra, as there are no known fossils preserving its cartilaginous skeleton at present.

References

Hemipristis
Miocene sharks
Miocene fish of North America
Fossil taxa described in 1843